Population count may refer to:

 A census, the process of obtaining information about every member of a population (not necessarily a human population)
 Hamming weight, the number of non-zero entries ('1' bits) in a byte, string, word, array or other similar data structure